The Libertador General Bernardo O'Higgins Region, often shortened to O'Higgins Region, is one of Chile's 16 first order administrative divisions. It is subdivided into three provinces. It is named in honour of Bernardo O'Higgins Riquelme, one of Chile's founding fathers.

The Libertador General Bernardo O'Higgins Region is bordered to the west by the Pacific Ocean, to the east by the Republic of Argentina, to the north by the Valparaíso and Santiago Metropolitan Regions, and to the south by the Maule Region. It extends approximately between the parallels of 33° 51' and 35° 01' south latitude, and between the meridian of 70° 02' west longitude and the Pacific Ocean.

The capital and largest city of the region is Rancagua. The second major town is San Fernando.

Geography

In pre-Quaternary times extensive Nothofagus forests covered much of Libertador General Bernardo O'Higgins Region.

The Libertador General Bernardo O'Higgins Region is part of the very restricted range of the endangered Chilean Wine Palm, Jubaea chilensis; in prehistoric times this Chilean endemic tree had a significantly larger range.

History
From 9000 BCE to 300 BCE (the Archaic Period), the humans who inhabited the region moved between the coast and the valley as well as the Andes. At sites such as Pichilemu, Cáhuil and Bucalemu, they left trash deposits or shell middens bearing testimony to their raids . During the Agroalfarero Period (300 BCE - 1470 CE), the inhabitants experienced changes in their way of life, the most important being the cultivation of vegetables and the manufacture of clay objects. From 600 CE onwards, they started cultivating beans, maize, squashes, pumpkins and quinoa. All of these except quinoa and some types of maize required irrigation, which prompted them to move to the banks of creeks and rivers. During this period, groups of people lived in Quincha houses with straw roofs, in the vicinity of irrigation channels and horticulture crops, a style of life attributable to the Promaucaes or Picunches and to the Chiquillanes. During the Colonial Period (1541 CE to 1811 CE), the region became dominated, like the rest of the country, by the Spanish, and a system of ranching became predominant .

Demography

The Libertador General Bernardo O'Higgins region contains a large part of the rural population (surpassed only by the Maule Region). Amongst the highly populated cities, Rancagua (206,971 inhabitants) stands out for having been transformed, in recent times, into an outskirt of Santiago. It is close being located 87 km south of Santiago. It is the capital of the Cachapoal Province as well the Libertador General Bernardo O'Higgins Region. According to the census of 2002, other densely populated cities are: San Fernando (49,519 inhabitants); Rengo (30,891); Machalí (23,920); Graneros (21,616); San Vicente de Tagua Tagua (18,914); Santa Cruz (18,603); Chimbarongo (13,795); Pichilemu (12,392), a well-known beach resort city founded by Agustin Ross Edwards in the late 19th century; and San Francisco de Mostazal (12,037).

Economy
The main industrial and export activity takes place at CODELCO's El Teniente mine, which contributes 7.7% of Chile's copper production. The ore is processed at the Sewell and Colón concentrator plants, smelted and refined at Caletones, and shipped from the port of San Antonio, in the Valparaíso Region. Byproducts include molybdenum and silver.

Agriculture contributes 30.1% of the region's GDP. One out of every four hectares of fruit orchards in Chile is in the Libertador General Bernardo O'Higgins Region. The main crops are apples and pears, followed by table grapes, plums, kiwis, and nectarines.

Manufacturing activity in the region is mostly related to copper mining, agribusiness, and food and beverages. One particular growth area is the production of fruit juices and pulp, and dehydrated fruit.

Over the past few years, there has been significant development in the forestry sector, especially plantations of eucalyptus and radiata pine.

Law and government
The region is co-governed by a presidential regional delegate, who is appointed by the president —currently independent Fabio López—, and popularly-elected governor of O'Higgins Pablo Silva Amaya (2021-2025 term).

The administration of the region rests with the regional government which is headed by the regional governor and the regional council (Consejo Regional de Chile). The latter comprises twenty regional council members, who are popularly elected since 2013 (thirteen from Cachapoal, five from Colchagua, and two from Cardenal Caro).

Administrative divisions
For purposes of interior administration, the Libertador General Bernardo O'Higgins Region is divided into three provinces:
 Cachapoal Province, capital: Rancagua,
 Colchagua Province, capital: San Fernando,
 Cardenal Caro Province, capital: Pichilemu.

The provinces are subdivided into 33 communes.

Education

Culture
This area is known as the "huaso province" after the name of the Chilean cowboy, the huaso. Sashes and mantas – traditional items of the huaso costume – are woven in Doñihue on heavy vertical looms. Designs imitate vine leaves, bunches of grapes, pines and copihues. Other designs of colored stripes are woven on horizontal looms.

The population is a mixture of both European (including Argentine immigrants) and indigenous races and cultures, thus the region has a homogeneous culture known as Chileanidad is present and a mestizo imprint is evident.

The Libertador General Bernardo O'Higgins Region was settled by Spaniards (notably Andalusians, Basques, Aragonese and Navarrese) and other Europeans. French and Italian families established agriculture including the important wine industry: the Wine Route is one of the main tourist attractions of the Colchagua valley. Breweries can be found as well, the legacy of German and Swiss immigration. Livestock herding was especially influenced by British, Greek and Yugoslavian settlers.

Regional festivals

Notable people
 Violeta Zúñiga (1933-2019), human rights activist

References

External links

"The Libertador Bernardo O'Higgins Region" at the Chilean government website 
 Regional government of the O'Higgins Region 
VI.cl: Portal de la Sexta Región (Portal for the Sixth Region) 
Pichilemu's official website 
 
 

 
Regions of Chile